The W and Z class was a class of sixteen destroyers of the Royal Navy launched in 1943–1944. They were constructed as two flotillas, with names beginning with "W-" and "Z-", respectively, although, like the preceding , two of the flotilla leaders were named after historical naval figures (as had been Royal Navy practice during the inter-war years). They were known as the 9th and 10th Emergency Flotilla, respectively and served as fleet and convoy escorts in World War II. None were lost during World War II but INS Eilat (originally HMS Zealous) was sunk during the Israel-Egypt conflict in October 1967 by Egyptian missile boats and the El Qaher (originally HMS Myngs) of the Egyptian Navy was sunk at Berenice, Egypt on 16 May 1970 by Israeli Air Force aircraft during the War of Attrition.

Design
Repeats of the preceding U and V-class destroyers, with modified director structures. The Z class were armed with 4.5 inch guns.

Ships

W class

Z class

See also
 The V and W-class destroyers: World War I destroyer class.
 Type 15 frigate: postwar full conversion of Wartime Emergency Programme destroyers into first-rate fast anti-submarine frigates

References
Notes

Bibliography

External links

Destroyer classes
Ship classes of the Royal Navy